"Video" is the first single released by American singer-songwriter India Arie, from her debut album, Acoustic Soul. The song also contains a sample of "Fun" by Brick and a sample of "Top Billin'" by Audio Two. Arie wrote the hook for the song in 1999.

It became her most successful song to date on the Billboard Hot 100, where it peaked in the top 50. In 2002, "Video" was nominated for four Grammy Awards:  Record of the Year, Song of the Year, Best Female R&B Vocal Performance, and Best R&B Song.

Charts

Weekly charts

Year-end charts

Other appearances
The song is heard in the third episode of the first season of The Newsroom. The song is also heard in an episode of The Proud Family ("Makeover"), when Penny is giving a make-over to one of the Gross sisters.

Release history

References

2001 debut singles
2001 songs
Motown singles
India Arie songs
Songs written by India Arie
Songs written by Shannon Sanders
Body image in popular culture